El amor nunca muere (English title: Love never dies) is a Mexican telenovela produced by Ernesto Alonso for Televisa in 1982. Is an adaptation of the work of Caridad Bravo Adams entitled La Mentira.

Christian Bach and Frank Moro starred as protagonists, while Silvia Pasquel and Rebecca Jones starred as main antagonists.

Cast 
Christian Bach as Cecilia
Frank Moro as Guillermo
Silvia Pasquel as Carolina
Aarón Hernán as Teodoro
Emilia Carranza as Sara
Tony Bravo as José Beltran
Olivia Buzzio as Gloria
Mario Cid as Father Marcial
Eduardo Yáñez as Alfonso
Guillermo Aguilar as Duval
Laura León as Azucena
Rebecca Jones as Mary Ann
Francisco Avendaño as Ricardo
Fabio Ramírez as Santiago
Aurora Cortes as Nana Gume
Fernando Sainz as Ronnie
Ignacio Rubiell as Genaro
Tito Duran as Julio
Bárbara Córcega as Zakuk
Juan Diego as Tobi

Awards

References

External links 

Mexican telenovelas
1982 telenovelas
Televisa telenovelas
Spanish-language telenovelas
1982 Mexican television series debuts
1983 Mexican television series endings